Tony Curtis (born Bernard Schwartz; June 3, 1925September 29, 2010) was an American actor whose career spanned six decades, achieving the height of his popularity in the 1950s and early 1960s. He acted in more than 100 films, in roles covering a wide range of genres. In his later years, Curtis made numerous television appearances.

He achieved his first major recognition as a dramatic actor in Sweet Smell of Success (1957) with co-star Burt Lancaster. The following year he was nominated for the Academy Award for Best Actor for The Defiant Ones (1958) alongside Sidney Poitier (who was also nominated in the same category). This was followed by the comedies Some Like It Hot and Operation Petticoat in 1959. In 1960, Curtis played a supporting role in the epic historical drama Spartacus.

His stardom and film career declined considerably after 1960. His most significant dramatic part came in 1968 when he starred in the true-life drama The Boston Strangler. Curtis also took on the role of the Ukrainian Cossack Andrei in the historical action romance epic Taras Bulba in 1962 and starred in the ITC TV series The Persuaders!, with Curtis playing American millionaire Danny Wilde. The series ran for twenty-four episodes.

Curtis is the father of actresses Kelly Curtis and Jamie Lee Curtis with his first wife, actress Janet Leigh, and actresses Allegra Curtis and Alexandra Curtis with his second wife Christine Kaufmann.

Early life
Tony Curtis was born Bernard Schwartz on June 3, 1925, at the Fifth Avenue Hospital corner of East 105th Street in Manhattan, New York City, the first of three boys born to Helen (née Klein) and Emanuel Schwartz. 

His parents were Hungarian Jewish emigrants from Hungary: his father was born in Ópályi, near Mátészalka, and his mother was a native of Nagymihály (now Michalovce, Slovakia); she later said she arrived in the U.S. from Válykó (now Vaľkovo, Slovakia). He spoke only Hungarian until the age of six, delaying his schooling. His father was a tailor and the family lived in the back of the shop. His mother was later diagnosed with schizophrenia. His youngest brother Robert was institutionalized with the same mental illness.

When Curtis was eight, he and his brother Julius were placed in an orphanage for a month because their parents could not afford to feed them. Four years later, Julius was struck and killed by a truck. Curtis joined a neighborhood gang whose main crimes were playing truant from school and minor pilfering at the local dime store. When Curtis was 11, a friendly neighbor saved him from what he felt would have led to a life of delinquency by sending him to a Boy Scout camp, where he was able to work off his energy and settle down. He attended Seward Park High School. At 16, he had his first small acting part in a school stage play.

Military service
Curtis enlisted in the United States Navy after the attack on Pearl Harbor. Inspired by Cary Grant's role in Destination Tokyo and Tyrone Power's in Crash Dive (1943), he joined the Pacific submarine force. Curtis served aboard a submarine tender, the USS Proteus, until the end of the Second World War. On September 2, 1945, Curtis witnessed the Japanese surrender in Tokyo Bay from his ship's signal bridge about a mile away.

Following his discharge from the Navy, Curtis attended City College of New York on the G.I. Bill. He then studied acting at The New School in Greenwich Village under the influential German stage director Erwin Piscator. His contemporaries included Elaine Stritch, Harry Belafonte, Walter Matthau, Beatrice Arthur, and Rod Steiger. While still at college, Curtis was discovered by Joyce Selznick, the notable talent agent, casting director, and niece of film producer David O. Selznick.

Career
In 1948, Curtis arrived in Hollywood at age 23. In his autobiography, Curtis described how by chance he met Jack Warner on the plane to California, and also how he briefly dated Marilyn Monroe before either were famous.

Universal as Anthony Curtis
Under contract at Universal Pictures, he changed his name from Bernard Schwartz to Anthony Curtis and met unknown actors Rock Hudson, James Best, Julie Adams and Piper Laurie. The first name was from the novel Anthony Adverse and "Curtis" was from Kurtz, a surname in his mother's family. Although Universal Pictures taught him fencing and riding, Curtis admitted he was initially only interested in girls and money--adding that he was pessimistic regarding his chances of becoming a major star. Curtis's biggest fear was having to return home to the Bronx as a failure:

I was a million-to-one shot, the least likely to succeed. I wasn't low man on the totem pole, I was under the totem pole, in a sewer, tied to a sack. 

Curtis's uncredited screen debut came in the crime drama Criss Cross (1949) playing a rumba dancer, dancing with Yvonne de Carlo. The male star was Burt Lancaster who would make a number of films with Curtis.

In his second film, City Across the River (also in 1949), he was credited as "Anthony Curtis"IMDB He had four lines in The Lady Gambles (1949) and a bigger part in Johnny Stool Pigeon (1949). He was also in Francis (1950), Woman in Hiding (1950), and I Was a Shoplifter (1950).

He was additionally in three Westerns, Sierra (1950), Winchester '73 (1950) and Kansas Raiders (1951), in which he was billed as "Tony Curtis."

Stardom
Curtis was receiving numerous fan letters, so Universal gave him the starring role in The Prince Who Was a Thief (1951), a swashbuckler set in the Middle East with Piper Laurie. It was a hit at the box office and Curtis was now established.

He followed it up with Flesh and Fury (1952), a boxing movie; No Room for the Groom (1952), a comedy with Laurie directed by Douglas Sirk; and Son of Ali Baba (1952), another film set in the Middle East with Laurie.

Curtis then starred with then-wife Janet Leigh in Houdini (1953), in which Curtis played the title role. His next movies were more "B" fare: All American (1953), as a footballer; Forbidden (1953), as a criminal; Beachhead (1954), a war film; Johnny Dark (1954) as a racing car driver; and The Black Shield of Falworth (1954), a medieval swashbuckler with Leigh. They were moderately successful financially, and Curtis was growing in popularity.

Curtis then starred in the musical So This Is Paris in (1955), before appearing in Six Bridges to Cross (1955), as a bank robber; The Purple Mask (1955) as a swashbuckler; and the boxing film The Square Jungle (1955).

Major star
Curtis graduated to more prestigious projects when he was cast as a co-star of Burt Lancaster and Gina Lollobrigida in Hecht-Lancaster Productions' Trapeze (1956). It was one of the biggest hits of the year. Curtis and Leigh formed their own independent film production company, Curtleigh Productions, in early 1955.

Curtis made a Western, The Rawhide Years (1957), was a gambler in Mister Cory (1957) and a cop in The Midnight Story (1957). Lancaster asked for him again, to play scheming press agent Sidney Falco in Sweet Smell of Success (1957), starring and co-produced by Lancaster. The film was a box office disappointment, but Curtis, for the first time in his career, received sensational reviews.

Curtis starred alongside Kirk Douglas and Janet Leigh in The Vikings (1958), which was a box office hit. Curtis then co-starred with Frank Sinatra and Natalie Wood in the war movie Kings Go Forth (1958), before starring in The Defiant Ones the following year as a bigoted white escaped convict chained to a black man (played by Sidney Poitier). At the 31st Academy Awards, Curtis was nominated for the Academy Award for Best Actor in a Leading Role for his performance - losing to David Niven in Separate Tables.

Curtis and Janet Leigh then starred in Blake Edwards' The Perfect Furlough (1958). He subsequently co-starred with Jack Lemmon and Marilyn Monroe in Some Like It Hot as well as Cary Grant in Operation Petticoat (1959).

Curtis and Leigh made one more film together Who Was That Lady? (1960), a comedy with Dean Martin. He and Debbie Reynolds then starred in The Rat Race (1960). He then started in a supporting role in Spartacus (1960), before making two biopics: The Great Impostor (1961), directed by Robert Mulligan, playing Ferdinand Waldo Demara; and The Outsider (1961), in which he played war hero Ira Hayes. He returned to epics with Taras Bulba (1962), co starring Yul Brynner and Christine Kaufmann, who became Curtis's second wife.

Comedic roles
On October 6, 1961, Curtis formed a new film production company, Curtis Enterprises, Incorporated. The company would make 40 Pounds of Trouble, which co-starred Curtis, Suzanne Pleshette and Phil Silvers; it was the first motion picture ever filmed at Disneyland. On August 3, 1962, Curtis formed another new film production company, Reynard Productions, Incorporated.

Curtis was one of many stars who had small roles in The List of Adrian Messenger (1963). He supported Gregory Peck in Captain Newman, M.D. (1963) and had an uncredited dual role in Paris When It Sizzles (1964). He and Kaufmann made their third movie together, the comedy Wild and Wonderful (1964). His focus remained on comedies: Goodbye Charlie (1964), with Debbie Reynolds; Sex and the Single Girl (1964), with Natalie Wood; The Great Race (1965), with Wood and Lemmon for Blake Edwards — the most expensive comedy film up till that time, but popular; Boeing Boeing (1965) a sex farce with Jerry Lewis; Not with My Wife, You Don't! (1966) with George C. Scott; Drop Dead Darling (1966), a British comedy with Rosanna Schiaffino; Don't Make Waves (1967), a satire of beach life from director Alexander Mackendrick, with Claudia Cardinale; and On My Way to the Crusades, I Met a Girl Who... (1967), an Italian comedy with Monica Vitti.  In the early 1960s, he was a voice-over guest star on The Flintstones as "Stoney Curtis".

The Boston Strangler
Because of the poor performance of a series of comedies, Curtis fired his agent and took a pay cut to $100,000 to play the title role in The Boston Strangler (1968), his first dramatic film in several years. Response from the critics and public was excellent. He returned to comedy for Monte Carlo or Bust! (1969), an all-star car race film in the vein of The Great Race.

He made some comic adventure tales: You Can't Win 'Em All (1970) with Charles Bronson and Suppose They Gave a War and Nobody Came (1970).

Curtis decided it was time to turn to television and co-starred with Roger Moore in the TV series The Persuaders! (1971).

He was one of the villains in The Count of Monte Cristo (1975) and had the title role in the gangster film Lepke (1975). Curtis had the lead in a TV series that did not last,  McCoy (1975–76). He was one of many names in The Last Tycoon (1976) and had the title role in an Italian comedy Casanova & Co. (1977). Later, Curtis co-starred as a casino owner in the Robert Urich 1978-1981 ABC series Vega$ and was in The Users (1978).

Later career

Curtis supported Mae West in Sextette (1978) and starred in The Manitou (1978), a horror film, and The Bad News Bears Go to Japan (1978), a comedy. He had good roles in It Rained All Night the Day I Left (1980), Little Miss Marker (1980) and The Scarlett O'Hara War (1980) and was one of many stars in The Mirror Crack'd (1980). On ABC, he co starred from 1978 to 1981 in prime time, as Las Vegas Desert Inn casino owner Philip (Slick) Roth, in 17 episodes of the Aaron Spelling produced series hit series, Vega$. After Vega$, on television, Curtis continued to make occasional guest appearances (sometimes playing fictional versions of himself) into the mid-2000s. His final TV series was as host of the documentary-retrospective series "Hollywood Babylon" 
(adapting Kenneth Anger's book series) in 1992–1993; each episode would include Curtis recalling some anecdotes from his own career.
In 2002, Curtis was in the national tour of Some Like it Hot, a modified revival of the 1972 musical Sugar (musical), itself based on the film in which he starred. Curtis played the supporting role of Osgood Fielding.

Painter
Throughout his life, Curtis enjoyed painting and, beginning in the early 1980s, painted as a second career. In the last years of his life, he concentrated on painting rather than movies. A surrealist, Curtis claimed Van Gogh, Matisse, Picasso, and Magritte as influences. "I still make movies but I'm not that interested in them any more. But I paint all the time." In 2007, his painting The Red Table was on display in the Metropolitan Museum of Art in New York City. His paintings can also be seen at the Tony Vanderploeg Gallery in Carmel, California.

Curtis spoke of his disappointment at never being awarded an Oscar. In March 2006, Curtis received the Sony Ericsson Empire Lifetime Achievement Award. He also has a star on the Hollywood Walk of Fame inducted in 1960, and received the Ordre des Arts et des Lettres from France in 1995.

Personal life

Curtis was married six times. His first wife was actress Janet Leigh, to whom he was married from 1951 to 1962, and with whom he fathered actresses Kelly and Jamie Lee. "For a while, we were Hollywood's golden couple," he said. "I was very dedicated and devoted to Janet, and on top of my trade, but in her eyes that goldenness started to wear off. I realized that whatever I was, I wasn't enough for Janet. That hurt me a lot and broke my heart."

The studio he was under contract with, Universal-International, generally stayed out of their stars' love lives. However, when they chose to get married, studio executives spent three days trying to talk him out of it, telling him he would be "poisoning himself at the box office." They threatened "banishment" back to the Bronx and the end of his budding career. In response, Curtis and Leigh decided to defy the studio heads and instead eloped and were married by a local judge in Greenwich, Connecticut. Comedian and close friend Jerry Lewis was present as a witness.

The couple divorced in 1962, and the following year Curtis married Christine Kaufmann, the 18-year-old German co-star of his latest film, Taras Bulba. He stated that his marriage with Leigh had effectively ended "a year earlier". Curtis and Kaufmann had two daughters, Alexandra (born July 19, 1964) and Allegra (born July 11, 1966). They divorced in 1968. Kaufmann resumed her career, which she had interrupted during her marriage.

On April 20, 1968, Curtis married Leslie Allen, with whom he had two sons: Nicholas Bernard (December 31, 1970 – July 2, 1994) and Benjamin Curtis (born May 2, 1973). The couple divorced in 1982.

On April 26, 1970, Curtis was arrested for marijuana possession at Heathrow Airport in London.

Curtis married Andrea Savio in 1984; they divorced in 1992.

The following year, on February 28, 1993, he married Lisa Deutsch. They divorced only a year later in 1994.

His sixth and last wife, Jill Vandenberg, was 45 years his junior. They met in a restaurant in 1993 and married on November 6, 1998. "The age gap doesn't bother us. We laugh a lot. My body is functioning and everything is good. She's the sexiest woman I've ever known. We don't think about time. I don't use Viagra either. There are 50 ways to please your lover."

In 1994, his son Nicholas died of a heroin overdose at the age of 23. After his son's death, Curtis remarked that it was "a terrible thing when a father loses his son."

According to the Pittsburgh Post-Gazette, Curtis, who had a problem with alcoholism and drug abuse, went through the treatment center of the Betty Ford Clinic in the mid-1980s, which was successful for him.

Philanthropy
Beginning in 1990, Curtis and his daughter Jamie Lee Curtis took a renewed interest in their family's Hungarian Jewish heritage, and helped finance the rebuilding of the Great Synagogue in Budapest, Hungary. The largest synagogue in Europe today, it was originally built in 1859 and suffered damage during World War II. In 1998, he also founded the Emanuel Foundation for Hungarian Culture, and served as honorary chairman. The organization works for the restoration and preservation of synagogues and the 1300 Jewish cemeteries in Hungary and is dedicated to the 600,000 Jewish victims of the Holocaust in Hungary and lands occupied by the Royal Hungarian Army. Curtis also helped promote Hungary's national image in commercials.

Books and appearances

In 1965, Tony Curtis was animated in an episode of The Flintstones; he also voiced his character Stoney Curtis.
In 1994, a mural featuring his likeness, painted by the artist George Sportelli, was unveiled on the Sunset Boulevard overpass of the Hollywood Freeway Highway 101 in Los Angeles. The mural was relocated to Hollywood Boulevard and Bronson Avenue in September 2011. His face is featured among the celebrities on the cover of the Sgt. Peppers Lonely Hearts Club Band album by The Beatles.

Also in 1994, the U.S. Navy Memorial Foundation awarded its Lone Sailor Award for his naval service and his subsequent acting career.

In 2004, he was inducted into the University of Nevada, Las Vegas Hall of Fame. A street is named after him in the Sun City Anthem development of his adopted hometown, Henderson, Nevada.

In 2005, Curtis was criticized after he stated that he would refuse to watch Brokeback Mountain. He additionally stated that John Wayne would not have approved of a film about gay cowboys.

In 2008, he was featured in the documentary The Jill & Tony Curtis Story about his efforts with his wife to rescue horses from slaughterhouses.

In October 2008, Curtis's autobiography American Prince: A Memoir, was published. In it, he describes his encounters with other Hollywood legends of the time including Frank Sinatra and James Dean, as well as his hard-knock childhood and path to success. It was followed by the publication of his next book, The Making of Some Like it Hot: My Memories of Marilyn Monroe and the Classic American Movie (2009). Curtis shared his memories of the making of the movie, in particular about Marilyn Monroe, whose antics and attitude on the set made everyone miserable.

On May 22, 2009, Curtis apologized to the BBC radio audience after he used three profanities in a six-minute interview with BBC presenter William Crawley. The presenter also apologized to the audience for Curtis's "Hollywood realism." Curtis explained that he thought the interview was being taped, when it was in fact live.

Health and death
In 1974, Curtis developed a heavy cocaine addiction while filming Lepke, at a time when his stardom had declined considerably and he was being offered few film roles. In 1984, Curtis was rushed to the hospital suffering from advanced cirrhosis as a result of his alcoholism and cocaine addiction. He then entered the Betty Ford Clinic and vowed to overcome his various illnesses. He underwent heart bypass surgery in 1994, after suffering a heart attack.

On July 8, 2010, Curtis, who suffered from chronic obstructive pulmonary disease (COPD), was hospitalized in Las Vegas after suffering an asthma attack during a book-signing engagement in Henderson, Nevada, where he lived.

Curtis died at his Henderson home on September 29, 2010, of cardiac arrest.

 A few days beforehand he had met photographer Andy Gotts for a photo-shoot at his home, saying: "I'm not in a good way at the moment but can I ask you one thing? Can you make me look like an icon just one more time?" He left behind five children and seven grandchildren. His widow Jill told the press that Curtis had suffered from various lung problems for years as a result of cigarette smoking, although he had quit smoking about 30 years earlier. In fact, during the 1960s Curtis served as the president of the American 'I Quit Smoking' Club. In a release to the Associated Press, his daughter, actress Jamie Lee Curtis, said:
My father leaves behind a legacy of great performances in movies and in his paintings and assemblages. He leaves behind children and their families who loved him and respected him and a wife and in-laws who were devoted to him. He also leaves behind fans all over the world. He will be greatly missed.

His remains were interred at Palm Memorial Park Cemetery in Henderson, Nevada, on October 4, 2010. The service was attended by daughters Kelly Curtis and Jamie Lee Curtis; as well as Arnold Schwarzenegger, Rich Little and Vera Goulet. Investor Kirk Kerkorian, actor Kirk Douglas, and singer Phyllis McGuire were among the honorary pallbearers.

Five months before his death he rewrote his will, naming all his children and intentionally disinheriting them with no explanation, then leaving his entire estate to his wife.

Filmography

Film

Television

Radio appearances

Awards and nominations

References

Further reading

  The book includes Tony Curtis's prose, poetry, and artwork.
 
 
 
 Wise, James. Stars in Blue: Movie Actors in America's Sea Services. Annapolis, MD: Naval Institute Press, 1997.

External links

 
 
 Biography and naval service from the California Center for Military History website
 Photographs at Virtual History
 Interview by Michael Hainey for GQ Magazine

1925 births
2010 deaths
20th-century American Jews
20th-century American male actors
21st-century American Jews
21st-century American male actors
American activists
American male comedy actors
American male film actors
American male painters
American male television actors
American people of Hungarian-Jewish descent
American people of Slovak-Jewish descent
Analysands of Ralph Greenson
California Democrats
City College of New York alumni
Curtis Enterprises
Curtleigh Productions
David di Donatello Career Award winners
Deaths from emphysema
Entertainers from the Bronx
Jewish American male actors
Jewish American military personnel
Jewish American writers
Jewish activists
Male actors from California
Male actors from Nevada
Male actors from New York City
Military personnel from New York City
Nevada Democrats
New York (state) Democrats
Seward Park High School alumni
The New School alumni
United States Navy non-commissioned officers
United States Navy personnel of World War II
Writers from California
Writers from Manhattan
Writers from Nevada